Dharmapuram is a village in West Godavari district in the state of Andhra Pradesh in India.

Demographics
 India census, Dharmapuram has a population of 1010 of which 510 are males while 500 are females. The average sex ratio of Dharmapuram village is 980. The child population is 114, which makes up 11.29% of the total population of the village, with sex ratio 966. In 2011, the literacy rate of Dharmapuram village was 70.54% when compared to 67.02% of Andhra Pradesh.

See also 
 West Godavari district

References 

Villages in West Godavari district